Säg ingenting till mig is the second studio album by Swedish singer-songwriter Melissa Horn, released on 14 October 2009 by Svedala and Sony Music. It was produced by Ola Gustafsson.

Track listing

Charts

Weekly charts

Year-end charts

References

2009 albums
Melissa Horn albums
Sony Music albums